The fictional races and peoples that appear in J. R. R. Tolkien's fantasy world of Middle-earth include the seven listed in Appendix F of The Lord of the Rings: Elves, Men, Dwarves, Hobbits, Ents, Orcs and Trolls, as well as spirits such as the Valar and Maiar. Other beings of Middle-earth are of unclear nature such as Tom Bombadil and his wife Goldberry.

Ainur

The Ainur were angelic spirits created by Eru Ilúvatar at the Beginning. The Ainur who subsequently entered the physical world of Middle-earth were the Valar ("powers"), though that term came to refer primarily to the mightiest among them.  Lesser spirits were called the Maiar. Most of the Valar and Maiar withdrew from Middle-earth to the Undying Lands of Valinor, though some of the Maiar assumed mortal forms to help or hinder the peoples of Middle-earth, such as the Istari (Wizards), Melian, Balrogs, and the Dark Lord Sauron.

Wizards

The wizards of Middle-earth were Maiar: spirits of the same order as the Valar, but lesser in power. Outwardly resembling Men but possessing much greater physical and mental power, they were called Istari (Quenya for "Wise Ones") by the Elves. They were sent by the Valar to assist the people of Middle-earth to contest Sauron. The first three of these five wizards were known in the Mannish tongues of the Lord of the Rings series as Saruman "man of skill" (Rohirric), Gandalf "elf of the staff" (northern Men), and Radagast "tender of beasts" (possibly Westron). Tolkien never provided non-Elvish names for the other two; one tradition gives their names in Valinor as Alatar and Pallando, and another as Morinehtar and Rómestámo in Middle-earth. Each wizard in the series had robes of a characteristic colour: white for Saruman (the chief and the most powerful of the five), grey for Gandalf, brown for Radagast,  and sea-blue for the remaining two, known consequently as the Blue Wizards. Gandalf and Saruman play important roles in The Lord of the Rings, while Radagast appears only briefly, innocently helping Saruman to deceive Gandalf, who believes Radagast since he is honest, and fortuitously alerting Gwaihir to rescue Gandalf again. The Blue Wizards do not feature in the story, as they are said to have journeyed far into the east after their arrival in Middle-earth.

As the Istari were Maiar, each one served a Vala in some way. Saruman was the servant and helper of Aulë, and so learned much in the art of craftsmanship, mechanics, and metal-working, as was seen in the later Third Age. Gandalf was the servant of Manwë or Varda, but was a lover of the Gardens of Lórien, and so knew much of the hopes and dreams of Men and Elves. Radagast, servant of Yavanna, loved the things of nature, both animals and plants. As each of these Istari learned from their Vala, so they acted in Middle-earth.

Balrogs

Demonic creatures of fire and shadow, Balrogs were fallen Maiar, loyal to the first Dark Lord, Morgoth. They participated in the wars of the First Age of Middle-earth but were mostly destroyed during the War of Wrath which ended the Age. By the Third Age, the only remaining Balrog was "Durin's Bane," the Balrog of Moria, killed by Gandalf.

Free peoples

The Free Peoples of Middle-earth were the four races that had never fallen under the sway of the evil spirits Morgoth or Sauron: Elves, Men, Dwarves and Ents. Strictly speaking, among Men it was only the Men of the West who were Free People, particularly the descendants of the Dúnedain of the Isle of Númenor, as most Men of the East and South of Middle-earth became servants of Morgoth and Sauron over the ages. The Ent Treebeard quotes lines from a traditional lay listing them:

First name the four, the free peoples
Eldest of all, the elf-children
Dwarf the delver, dark are his houses
Ent the earthborn, old as mountains
Man the mortal, master of horses

After encountering the hobbits Merry and Pippin, he consents that hobbits are a fifth free people, adding a fifth line, "Half-grown hobbits, the hole-dwellers".

Dwarves

The race of Dwarves preferred to live in mountains and caves, settling in places such as Erebor (the Lonely Mountain), the Iron Hills, the Blue Mountains, and Moria (Khazad-dûm) in the Misty Mountains. Aulë the Smith created Dwarves; he also invented the Dwarven language, known as Khuzdul. Dwarves mined and worked precious metals throughout the mountains of Middle-earth. The seven different groups of Dwarf-folk originated in the locations where the Seven Fathers of the Dwarves first awoke before the First Age.

Elves

The Elves, or Firstborn, were the first of Eru's Children to awaken. Born under the stars before the ascension of the Moon and the Sun, they retain a special love for light and an inner spirit endowed with unique gifts. They call themselves the Quendi, or "Speakers", for they were the first to utter words; and, even now, no race understands language and song like the Firstborn. Fair and fine featured, brilliant and proud, immortal and strong, tall and agile, they are the most blessed of the Free Peoples. They can see as well under moon or starlight as a man at the height of day. They cannot become sick or scarred, but if an Elf should die, from violence or losing the will to live from grief, their spirit goes to the halls of Mandos, and as they are bound to Arda and cannot leave until the world is broken and remade. Elven skill and agility is legendary: for instance, walking atop freshly fallen snow without leaving a trace of their passing. On a clear day they can see ten miles with perfect clarity and detail up to 100 miles. These gifts come at great cost, though: they are strongly bound to Fate (see Mandos) and hated by Morgoth. No other race has been blessed and cursed more than the Quendi.

The Quendi were sundered after the awakening and many sub-groups appeared. The First Sundering occurred when some left Middle-earth to live in the blessed realm of Valinor, while others stayed behind. This produced the Eldar, who accepted the call to come to Valinor, and the Avari who refused the great journey.
Elves who stayed in Middle-earth and never saw the light of the trees became known as the Moriquendi or "Dark-elves". This did not imply that the Dark-elves were evil, they just never saw the light of the trees.

On the journey to Valinor, some of the Teleri ("Those who tarried") abandoned the main group and those of them who did not mingle with the Moriquendi became the Laiquendi (Green-elves), the Sindar (Grey-elves) and the Nandor. These elves of the great journey who remained in Middle-earth were then called the Úmanyar (The Unwilling). The Eldar who reached Valinor were eventually divided into three distinct groups: Vanyar, Noldor and Teleri. These three groups became known as the Calaquendi or "Light-elves" because they beheld the light of the Two Trees of Valinor. Later some of the Noldor went back to Middle-earth in their quest for the Silmarils, while the Vanyar remained in Valinor.

The Silvan Elves, of Nandor and Avari descent, inhabited Mirkwood and Lothlórien.

Men

During the time of The Lord of the Rings, Men in Middle-earth were located in many places, with the largest group of free men in the countries of Gondor and Rohan. When the island of Númenor fell, only the Faithful escaped and founded the twin kingdoms of Gondor and Arnor. The Faithful were known in Middle-earth as the Dúnedain, and as leaders of these kingdoms, they were able to lead the resistance to Sauron, and preserve the Men of the West as Free People. There were also free men at the village of Bree, at Esgaroth, in Drúadan Forest (home to "wild men" known as Drúedain or Woses), and in the icy regions of Forochel. Those who served evil powers, such as the men of Dunland, Rhûn, Harad, and Umbar, were not considered free men. Men bear the so-called Gift of Men, mortality.
The descendants of the Dúnedain include the Rangers of the North and the Rangers of Ithilien.

Drúedain

The Drúedain, one of the earliest varieties of men, lived in small numbers, often in tribes. They were little folk, shorter than dwarves, yet taller than hobbits. They were known for their voodoo-like magic, their black eyes (which glow red when they are angry), and their ability to sit for hours and days on end without moving or blinking. They grew little hair, except that on their heads and sometimes small tufts on their chins. They were short and stout, and other men tended to dislike them due to their harsh, rough voices. Their laughter, however, was full of mirth. It is said that their skill of stonework rivaled the Dwarves'. The Drughu were not evil. They were mortal enemies of orcs, defending the homes of their human neighbors with their own lives and with the aid of their magical Watch-Stones. The Elves of Beleriand developed a special fondness for them and valued their skill at fighting orcs.

Ents

Ents were an ancient race of tree-like creatures, having become like the trees that they shepherd. They were created by Yavanna and given life by Ilúvatar. By the Third Age, they were a dwindling race, having long ago lost their mates, the Entwives.

Huorns

Close kin of the Ents, Huorns were animated trees that possessed sentience. They were said to have voices but could only be understood by the Ents, not by the other peoples of Middle-earth. It is unclear if Huorns were simply trees that became aware or Ents that became more "treeish" over time (both varieties were thought to exist). Huorns were found in Fangorn Forest and possibly the Old Forest near Buckland. Legolas mentions that the Elves helped to wake up the trees. The Huorns decided the Battle of Helm's Deep, destroying Saruman's army of Orcs when they fled towards them.

Hobbits

Hobbits are a race of Middle-earth, also known as 'halflings' on account of their short stature, roughly half the size of men. They are characterized by curly hair on their heads and leathery feet that have furry insteps, for which they did not wear shoes. Many hobbits live in the Shire as well as Bree, and they once lived in the vales of the Anduin. They are fond of an unadventurous life of farming, eating, and socializing. There were three types of Hobbits:  The Harfoots were the most numerous. The Stoors had an affinity for water, boats and swimming; the Fallohides were an adventurous people. The origin of hobbits is unclear, but of all the races they have the closest affinity to men, and in the Prologue to The Lord of the Rings Tolkien calls them relatives of men.

Enslaved peoples

Enslaved peoples were those races that had fallen under the sway of the evil spirits Morgoth and Sauron, also known by the Free Peoples as 'Servants of the Enemy'. They included Orcs, Trolls and Men. The origin of Orcs and Trolls is unclear, but they were races that were taken by Morgoth and corrupted through sorcery into their final evil nature and appearance. Men were rarely corrupted by Morgoth or Sauron in the same way. Rather, their hearts and minds were corrupted by power and evil impulses, while they retained the physical appearance of men. Prolonged service to Sauron however, did turn the bearers of the Rings of Power from Men into the wraith-like Nazgûl. Those men who were the servants of Morgoth or Sauron were mostly from the east and south of Middle-earth.

Men

Not all Men were on the side of good; the Men who lived in the east and south were under Sauron's dominion. They included the Haradrim or Southrons and the Black Númenóreans (and later the Corsairs of Umbar) who pledged their allegiance to Mordor, and many different Easterling peoples, such as the Balchoth, the Wainriders, and the Men of Khand, who attacked Gondor and Rohan on numerous occasions. The Men of Dunland served as agents to the traitorous wizard Saruman. In the First Age, some Easterlings were under Morgoth's dominion.

Ringwraiths

The Ringwraiths (also known as Nazgûl or Black Riders) were once great Men until they were given Rings of Power by Sauron. These gradually corrupted them until they became slaves of the Dark Lord's will. Clad in dark hooded cloaks and riding demonic steeds or flying "fell beasts," the Ringwraiths forever hunted for the One Ring to bring it back to their master.

The Dead

Also known as ghosts or shades, they were spirits of Men unable to pass on to the afterlife. Spirits haunted various regions of Middle-earth, most notably the Dead Marshes and the Paths of the Dead, which were guarded by the Dead Men of Dunharrow.

Orcs 

Orcs were a race first bred by Morgoth, which mostly lived in mountain caves and disliked sunlight. Many of them lived in the Misty Mountains while others lived in Mordor. They are also known as goblins. The Orcs were not created, since "evil cannot create, only corrupt" in Tolkien's philosophical perspective. One version of their origin, widely known in part due to its use in Peter Jackson's films, postulates that they were Elves who were corrupted and whose appearance was changed over time. However, Tolkien also wrote other accounts of their origin, in an attempt to resolve the dilemma of how they could be sentient and wholly evil.

Sauron and Saruman the wizard bred an unusually large and powerful type of orc, the Uruk-hai. Although most orcs did not like the sun and could not bear to be in it, the Uruk-hai could stand daylight. Deformed half-orcs also existed, crossbred from Men and Orcs.

Goblins 

Tolkien uses the term "Goblin" mainly interchangeably with Orc, though sometimes in The Hobbit the term is exclusively used for the smaller sub-races of Orcs native to the Misty Mountains.

Trolls

Trolls were said to have been created by Morgoth "in mockery of" the Ents. They disliked the sun and some types like the three Trolls from The Hobbit turned to stone if exposed to sunlight. Trolls dwelt in the Misty Mountains as well as in Mordor. Sauron bred the Olog-hai: large, clever, and resistant to the sun.

Barrow-wights

Barrow-wights (from Middle English wight, a man) were dark spirits sent by the Witch-king of Angmar to possess and animate the bodies and bones of the former kings of the Dúnedain. These undead monsters haunted the Barrow-downs near Bree.

Other beings

Tom Bombadil

Tom Bombadil does not belong to any of the peoples of Middle-earth; Tolkien calls him the spirit of the countryside. Unlike the other races, he is seemingly unaffected by the One Ring and appears to predate the Children of Ilúvatar (Elves and Men). As to the nature of Bombadil, Tolkien himself said that some things should remain mysterious in any mythology, "especially if an explanation actually exists."

Tom is also known as "The First", "Master Tom", "Old Tom", "Iarwain Ben-adar" (a Sindarin name meaning "The Oldest without a father"). The Noldor call him "Orald" meaning "Very Old", Dwarves call him "Forn" (meaning: The Ancient).

River-spirits

Spirits of nature tied to rivers and waterways. Only two are mentioned by Tolkien: Goldberry, the wife of Tom Bombadil, and her mother the River-woman. It is unknown whether these beings were unique, part of a larger race, or a form of Maiar.

Giants

Giants other than Ents are referred to only a few times by Tolkien. Stone-giants of the Misty Mountains are briefly mentioned, being said to lob stones at Thorin and Company in The Hobbit.

Dragons

Dragons are already present in The Book of Lost Tales. Tolkien had been fascinated with dragons since childhood, and he named four dragons in his Middle-earth writings. Like the Old Norse dragon Fafnir, they are able to speak, and can be subtle of speech.

Glaurung, in The Silmarillion, is the Father of Dragons in Tolkien's legendarium, the first of the Fire-drakes of Angband. Tolkien wrote that Glaurung had four legs and no wings and could not fly, and sired the brood of Urulóki, wingless fire-breathing dragons. He was bred by Morgoth from some unknown stock and was the first dragon to appear outside of Angband. Glaurung is the main antagonist of The Children of Húrin, and his deceptive actions led to the suicides of its main characters Túrin Turambar and Niënor Níniel.

Ancalagon the Black (Sindarin: rushing jaws from anc 'jaw', alag 'impetuous') was the first of the winged Fire-drakes and the greatest of all dragons, bred by Morgoth during the First Age, as told in The Silmarillion. Ancalagon is so large that his body crushed "the towers of Thangorodrim" when he fell on them after being killed by Eärendil. 

Scatha was a mighty "long-worm" of the Grey Mountains. He was killed by Fram in the early days of the Éothéod. After slaying Scatha, Fram's ownership of his recovered hoard was then disputed by the Dwarves of that region. Fram rebuked this claim, sending them instead Scatha's teeth, with the words, "Jewels such as these you will not match in your treasuries, for they are hard to come by." This led to his death in a feud with the Dwarves. The Éothéod retained at least some of the hoard, and brought it south with them when they settled in Rohan. The silver horn that Éowyn gave to Merry Brandybuck after the War of the Ring, crucial in "The Scouring of the Shire", came from this hoard.

Smaug of Erebor, the Lonely Mountain, was killed by Bard the Bowman in Dale, as told in The Hobbit. Smaug serves as a main antagonist of Thorin and Company, as they seek to reclaim the Dwarven kingdom of Erebor that Smaug had taken.

References

Primary

This list identifies each item's location in Tolkien's writings.

Secondary

Sources 

 
 
 
 
 
 
 
 
 
 

Middle-earth monsters